Axel Otto Christian Hagemann  (4 May 1856 –1 September 1907) was a Norwegian politician for the Conservative Party.

He was elected to the Norwegian Parliament in 1895, representing the constituency of Finmarkens Amt. He only served one term.

References

1846 births
1907 deaths
Conservative Party (Norway) politicians
Members of the Storting
Finnmark politicians